Western District was one of four districts of the Province of Quebec created in 1788 in the western reaches of the Montreal District which were later detached in 1791 to create the new colony of Upper Canada. Known as Hesse District (named after Hesse in Germany) until 1792, it was abolished in 1849.

Historical evolution
The District originally consisted of that part of the Province of Quebec west of "a north and south line, intersecting the extreme projection of Long Point into the lake Erie," being the territory described as:

As Detroit was still occupied British territory in 1792, it formed part of the District at the time. In the first election to the Legislative Assembly of Upper Canada, three former or current residents of Detroit were elected. This anomaly, together with other occupied places at Fort Mackinac and Fort Miami, were finally vacated upon the ratification of the Jay Treaty in 1795; they were withdrawn from the District in June 1796.

The District, after detaching territory that would be part of the new London District, was reconstituted as the Western District by an Act of the Parliament of Upper Canada in 1798. It was described as consisting of "...the Counties of Essex and Kent together with so much of this Province as is not included within any other district thereof..." The counties were described as consisting of the following:

In 1847, legislation was initiated to create a new Kent District; however, facilities at the designated district town of Chatham needed to be built. The creation of the new district was not completed.

At the beginning of 1850, the District was abolished, being replaced by the United Counties of Essex and Kent for municipal purposes. In 1851, the southern part of Kent was detached to for a separate county, with the northern part becoming Lambton County, which was united with Essex to become the United Counties of Essex and Lambton. However, Kent and Lambton were united for the purpose of electing a member to the Parliament of the Province of Canada. The former District's townships were accordingly distributed as follows:

Legacy
Western District Grammar School, founded 1807, is now occupied by General Brock Public School in Windsor, Ontario.

Further reading

Notes

References

External links
 Changing Shape of Ontario: Early Districts and Counties

Districts of Upper Canada
1788 establishments in the Province of Quebec (1763–1791)
1849 disestablishments in Canada